Pakenham South is a suburb and rural locality in Melbourne, Victoria, Australia,  south-east of Melbourne's Central Business District, located within the Shire of Cardinia local government area. Pakenham South recorded a population of 229 at the 2021 census.

History

Pakenham South is situated in the Kulin nation traditional Aboriginal country. The Boon Wurrung people are local custodians within the Kulin nation. The origin of the suburb name is from Sir Edward Pakenham and the geographic position south of the Pakenham main settlement.

See also
 Shire of Pakenham – Pakenham South was previously within this former local government area.

References

Suburbs of the Shire of Cardinia